The Tiwi Islands ( meaning "two islands") are part of the Northern Territory, Australia,  to the north of Darwin adjoining the Timor Sea.

The Tiwi Land Council is one of four land councils in the Northern Territory. It is a representative body with statutory authority under the Aboriginal Land Rights (Northern Territory) Act 1976, and has responsibilities under the Native Title Act 1993 and the Pastoral Land Act 1992.

Geography and population
 
The Tiwi Islands were created by sea level rise at the end of the last ice age, which finished about 11,700 years ago, with the flooding occurring an estimated 8,200 to 9,650 years ago. The story of the flooding is told in Tiwi traditional stories and creation myths passed down orally from generation to generation ever since.

The island group consists of two large inhabited islands (Melville and Bathurst), and nine smaller uninhabited islands (Buchanan, Harris, Seagull, Karslake, Irritutu, Clift, Turiturina, Matingalia and Nodlaw). Bathurst Island is the fifth-largest island of Australia and accessible by sea and air. Melville Island is Australia's second largest island (after Tasmania).

A car ferry at the narrowest point provides a quick connection between Melville and Bathurst Islands.

They are inhabited by the Tiwi people, as they have been for thousands of years before European settlement in Australia. The Tiwi are an Aboriginal Australian people, culturally and linguistically distinct from those of Arnhem Land on the mainland just across the water. In 2021, the total population of the islands was 2,348, of whom 87% were Aboriginal people.
Most residents speak Tiwi as their first language and English as a second language.

Most of the population live in Wurrumiyanga (known as Nguiu until 2010) on Bathurst Island, and Pirlangimpi (also known as Garden Point) and Milikapiti (also known as Snake Bay) on Melville Island. Wurrumiyanga has a population of nearly 1500, the other two centres around 450 each. There are other smaller settlements, including Wurankuwu (Ranku) Community on western Bathurst Island.

History

Aboriginal people have occupied the area that became the Tiwi Islands for at least 40,000 years, with creation stories relating their presence on the islands at least 7,000 years before present.

Tiwi islanders are believed to have had contact with Macassan traders, and the first historical record of contact between Indigenous islanders and European explorers was with the Dutch "under the command of Commander Maarten van Delft who took three ships, the Nieuw Holland, the Waijer, and the Vosschenbosch, into Shark Bay on Melville Island and landed on 30 April 1705". There were other visits by explorers and navigators in the seventeenth, eighteenth and nineteenth centuries, including by Dutchman Pieter Pieterszoon, Frenchman Nicholas Baudin and Briton Philip Parker King.

In February 1824 Captain Gordon Bremer was appointed by the Admiralty, upon instruction from the British Colonial Office, to take possession of Bathurst and Melville Islands, along with the Cobourg Peninsula (now part of Arnhem Land) on the mainland to the east, subject to the land being unoccupied by any people except "...the Natives of those or any of the other Eastern Islands". Bremer established the first European settlement on the Islands, which was also the first British settlement in northern Australia, at Fort Dundas on Melville Island, near present-day Pirlangimpi in September 1824. However, owing in part to the hostility of the Indigenous population, it lasted only five years, being abandoned in 1829. As "the first attempted European and military settlement anywhere in northern Australia", the site is on Australia's Register of the National Estate.

Despite the failure of the settlement, Bremer had claimed the northern area of the continent and adjacent islands as part of New South Wales (then under Governor Thomas Brisbane). Jurisdiction of the Northern Territory, including the Tiwi Islands was taken over by the Government of the Colony of South Australia by instruction from the Colonial Office in 1863, but this was finally relinquished to the federal government, after years of negotiations, in 1911.

Soon before the South Australian government handed over the Territory, it gave notice that up to 5,000 acres were available north of the 18th parallel south, which included land on Bathurst Island. In September 1910 the German Catholic missionary Francis Xavier Gsell  applied for a license to establish a Christian mission in similar way that land grants had been made in British New Guinea. In the same month the South Australian government declared the whole of Bathurst Island an Aboriginal reserve, and granted  for the mission.  The mission was established by Gsell on Bathurst Island in 1911. A timber church built in the 1930s is a prominent landmark in Wurrumiyanga. The Catholic mission had positive impacts, through access to education and welfare services, but also negative effects through the suppression of Aboriginal language and culture. Nova Peris' mother, Joan, was raised in this mission after being taken from her mother; she was one of the Stolen Generations.

The Tiwi artwork in the Catholic church, and the translation of Biblical stories into Tiwi, are both notable.

Control of the islands was transferred to the Indigenous traditional owners through the Tiwi Aboriginal Land Trust, and the Tiwi Land Council that was founded in 1978. The Tiwi Islands local government area was established in 2001, when the previous community government councils in the three main communities of Wurrumiyanga (Bathurst Island), Pirlangimpi and Milikapiti (Melville Island) were amalgamated with the Wurankuwu Aboriginal Corporation to form a single local government. The Tiwi Islands Local Government was replaced in 2008 by the Tiwi Islands Shire Council as part of a Northern Territory-wide restructuring of local government.

Politics and administration

Electorates
The Tiwi Islands are part of the federal electorate of Lingiari, for which the current member is Marion Scrymgour. The islands are within the Northern Territory electorate of Arafura. The current member for Arafura is Lawrence Costa, from the Labor Party.

Local government
The administration of the islands is divided between the local Tiwi Islands Regional Council, and the Indigenous landholder representative organisation, the Tiwi Land Council. Representatives on the Shire Council are elected from four wards, and include 12 councillors.
Milikapiti Ward (northeast Melville Island, largest)
Nguiu Ward (south Bathurst Island, Buchanan Island)
Pirlangimpi Ward (west and southwest Melville Island)
Wurankuwu Ward (north Bathurst Island)
In 2011–12, the operating budget of the then Tiwi Islands Shire Council was A$26.4 million. As of 2019, the elected Mayor of Tiwi Islands Shire Council is Lesley Tungutalum.

Locality

On 4 April 2007, the land occupied by the Tiwi Islands and adjoining waters were gazetted by the Northern Territory Government as a locality with the name, 'Tiwi Islands.  The boundary of the locality is similar to that gazetted in 1978 by the Australian government for the Tiwi Land Council.

Culture

Indigenous art

The creation of Indigenous Australian art is an important part of Tiwi Island culture and its economy. There are three Indigenous art centres on the islands: Tiwi Design, Munupi Arts & Crafts, and Jilamara Arts and Craft, and these collaborate through a cooperative venture, Tiwi Art. Apart from Tiwi Art network there are two independent operations: fabric design, printing and clothing business Bima Wear, operated by Indigenous women since 1969, and Ngaruwanajirri, also known as 'The Keeping Place'.

Tiwi artists who have held international exhibitions or whose works are held in major Australian collections include Kitty Kantilla, Donna Burak, Jean Baptiste Apuatimi, and Fiona Puruntatameri.

A lot of wood carvings of birds are made by Tiwi people. Some of these are displayed in the Mission Heritage Gallery on Bathurst Island. The carvings represent various birds from Tiwi mythology, which have various meanings. Certain birds tell the Tiwi people about approaching monsoonal rains whilst others warn of impending cyclones. Others, depending on the totem of the people, alert the Tiwi people that someone has died in a particular clan. There are others that represent ancestral beings who were, according to mythology, changed into birds. Carved birds are sometimes at the top of pukumani poles, which are placed at burial sites.

The carving of human sculptures on the Tiwi islands was introduced by Cardo Kerinauia into Paru village in the 1960s after he had seen sculptures in Darwin Paru villagers soon started a cottage industry of wood carving and had several pioneering Tiwi artists including Declan Apuatimi, Enraeld Munkara and Mick Aruni

The Tiwi people also create many of their designs on fabric. The main method uses wax to resist dyeing similarly to Indonesian batik prints. Various fabrics are used ranging from sturdy, woven cotton to delicate silks, from which they create silk scarves.

The creation of their artwork is usually a social activity and consists of groups of people sitting together and talking whilst they work in a relaxed fashion. Often these grouping are segregated by gender.

Pukamani

The pukamani, or pukumani, is a burial ceremony based on a Dreamtime story, which is performed around carved and painted grave posts, known as tutini (sometimes referred to as pukumani poles). The ceremony takes place two to six months after the burial, and may last for a few days. Specially commissioned carvers carve and paint up to 12 tutini, which are erected around the grave mound. They are made from ironwood and decorated with white clay, black charcoal, and ground yellow or red ochre.

Dancers thread their way amongst the tutini and at the end of the ceremony, Tunga, or painted bark baskets, are placed on top of the posts. The burial poles, which are intended as gifts to please the spirits of the dead, are left to decay.

There is some discussion about whether the poles are sacred ritualistic objects, or a commodified work of fine art (in one case, an exhibition displaying objects which resembled the poles created by Melbourne designers was withdrawn) but specially commissioned poles are freely borrowed or sold for displays in art galleries around Australia and the world.

Music

B2M

The band B2M ("Bathurst to Melville"), fronted by Jeffrey "Yello" Simon, was formed in the Tiwi Islands in December 2004 in Nguiu (now Wurrumiyanga) Simon, who started a career in the police force and had to attend attempted suicides, was determined to try to make a difference through music. As of 2015 other band members included Greg Orsto, James “Fab” Kantilla, Daniel Cunningham, Darren Narul and dancer Shelton Murray, all of whom sing.

They made their first recording from a live acoustic set in Darwin in 2008, which was titled B2M – Live at The Monsoon Sessions. Later in the same year, they won Emerging Artist of the Year at the NT Indigenous Music Awards (now called the National Indigenous Music Awards). In 2011 the band released their first official track, "Japparik'a", which is the Tiwi Bombers Football Club’s anthem. Their debut album (2213) Home was released in 2015 on Skinnyfish Music, containing work shaped over 10 years. It included their first single, "Parlingarri", which contains an old Tiwi chant never before heard outside the Tiwi Islands; special permission had to obtained from Tiwi elders to use it.

They have a large Indigenous following in Australia, where they often sing songs with positive messages about alcohol and drugs. They have toured East Timor, Bali and Shanghai.  The band toured Taiwan, headlining the Pulima Indigenous arts festival in 2016, and played the Northern Territory's Barunga Festival in 2018. They sang more traditional songs in Taiwan, and were inspired by their experience there to instigate "Project Songlines", in which they mix very old traditional Tiwi chants with chants from other indigenous cultures. Also in 2018, they did a nationwide tour named Mamanta, performing at the Riverside Theatres in Parramatta in September. They had been working with Australian-Irish musician Steve Cooney, including experimenting with mixing up traditional Irish Gaelic music with Tiwi sounds. Their main motivation for touring is to share their culture. The 2018 tour included 23 shows and 15 workshops.

Sadly, singer Greg Orsto died on 5 January 2021 of a heart attack, aged 59. He was described as "“the heart of B2M, a quiet but powerful influence on the band”.

Sport

Australian rules football 
Australian rules football is the most popular sport on the Tiwi Islands, and was introduced in 1941 by missionaries John Pye and Andy Howley. There has been a Tiwi Islands Football League competition since 1969.

The Tiwi Australian Football League has 900 participants out of a community of about 2600, the highest football participation rate in Australia (35%). The Tiwi Islands Football League Grand Final is held in March each year and attracts up to 3,000 spectators.

Tiwi footballers are renowned for exquisite "one-touch" skills. Many of the players have a preference for playing barefoot. Many of the male players also play for the St Mary's Football Club in Darwin, which was formed specifically to allow Tiwi soldiers in the 1950s to play in the Northern Territory Football League.

The Tiwi Bombers Football Club fielded a team in the Northern Territory Football League from the 2006/07 season.

Notable footballers from the Tiwi Islands to have played in the national VFL / AFL competition. Particularly notable is the Rioli family has produced a dynasty of AFL players related to Cyril Rioli Snr. Notable members of this family include Maurice Rioli, Cyril Rioli, Daniel Rioli, Dean Rioli, Willie Rioli, Daniel Rioli and Maurice Rioli Jr. Other notable players include Ronnie Burns, Michael Long, Austin Wonaeamirri, David Kantilla Anthony McDonald-Tipungwuti and Ben Long.

Maurice Rioli (1982) and Michael Long (1993) are both uncles of Cyril Rioli (2015), and all three have won the Norm Smith Medal for being adjudged the best player of an AFL Grand Final.

The Tiwi Islands Football Club was the subject of a series on ABC's Message Stick in 2009, called "In A League of Their Own".

Cricket
As reported in The Weekend Australian in 2010, Australian cricketers led by Mathew Hayden raised $200,000 for cricket development in the Tiwi Islands.  With former internationals Allan Border, Michael Kasprowicz and Andy Bichel, the match between Hayden XI and Border XI had a turnout of 1,000 people, nearly half the islands' population.

Transport

A commercial flight operator, Fly Tiwi, connects both islands to each other and to Darwin. Formed as an association between Hardy Aviation and the Tiwi Land Council, Fly Tiwi has daily flights to all three communities on the islands.

SeaLink NT operates ferry services connecting Wurrumiyanga and Darwin, making the 2.5-hour trip each way three days a week.

In 2008, local government maintained  of roads on the islands.

Environment, conservation and land use
The islands' climatic and geographical extremity means that they have distinctive vegetation and special conservation values:because of their isolation and because they have extremely high rainfall, the Tiwi Islands support many species not recorded elsewhere in the Northern Territory (or in the world), and some range-restricted species. The Tiwi Islands contain the Territory’s best-developed (tallest and with greatest basal area) eucalypt forests and an unusually high density and extent of rainforests.

Climate
The wet season from November to April brings the islands the highest rainfall in the Northern Territory. The Tiwi people describe three distinct seasons: the dry (season of smoke), the buildup (high humidity and cicadas songs) and the wet (storms) The seasons frame the lifestyle of the Tiwi people, dictating the food sources available and their ceremonial activities.

Tiwi is subject to a recurring meteorological phenomenon, dubbed Hector, wherein a thunderstorm forms nearly every day from November to December and February through March. The storm is very powerful, going over 20 kilometres into the atmosphere, and is visible from as far away as Darwin. It is caused by the collision of sea breezes across the islands.

Flora and fauna
The islands have been isolated from the Australian mainland since the last Ice Age. They are covered mainly with eucalypt forest on a gently sloping lateritic plateau.  The extensive open forest, open woodlands and riparian vegetation are dominated by Darwin Stringybarks, Woollybutts, and Cajuputs.  There are small patches of rainforest occurring in association with perennial freshwater springs, and mangroves occupying the numerous inlets.

There is a range of threatened and endemic species on the Tiwi Islands. Thirty-eight threatened species have been recorded, and a number of plants and invertebrates are found nowhere else, including eight plant species and some land snails and dragonflies. The islands are exceptionally mammal diverse, hosting 36 species of native mammals. Threatened mammals include Brush-tailed rabbit rats, northern brush-tailed phascogales, false water rats and Carpentarian dunnarts. The islands host the world's largest breeding colony of crested terns and a large population of the vulnerable olive ridley turtle; a sea turtle conservation program commenced on the islands in 2007. The seas and estuaries around the islands are home to several species of shark and saltwater crocodiles.

Invasive mammals on the islands include black rats, cats, pigs, water buffalo, horses, and cattle. Water buffalo are common on Melville Island but not Bathurst Island, while feral pigs are common on Bathurst Island but not Melville Island. The Tiwi Land Council is currently working to eradicate feral pigs from Melville Island before they can establish a large population. The Tiwi Land Council and the Tiwi Aboriginal community more broadly are both in favor of feral cat eradication, although no plans for it are currently underway.

Important Bird Area
The islands have been identified as an Important Bird Area (IBA) by BirdLife International because they support relatively high densities of red goshawks, partridge pigeons and bush stone-curlews, as well as up to 12,000 (over 1% of the world population) great knots.  Other birds for which the Tiwi Island populations are globally significant include chestnut rails, beach stone-curlews, northern rosellas, varied lorikeets, rainbow pittas, silver-crowned friarbirds, white-gaped, yellow-tinted and bar-breasted honeyeaters, canary white-eyes and masked finches. The birds have a high level of endemism at the subspecific level; the Tiwi masked owl (Tyto novaehollandiae melvillensis) is considered endangered and the Tiwi hooded robin (Melanodryas cucullata melvillensis) is at least endangered and may be extinct.

Forestry and mining

Forest products are an important part of the Tiwi Islands economy, but the sector has had a chequered history. Forestry dates back to 1898, with plantations being trialled from the 1950s and 1960s. A native softwood enterprise was established in the mid-1980s, as a partnership between the private sector and the Land Council, but by the mid-1990s, the Land Council was winding the venture down, noting that its investor partner had "various tax driven ambitions which are growingly incompatible with our own employment and sustainable production goals". Despite the setback, it was still considered that forestry was likely to be crucial to the Tiwi economy, and in 2001 the Land Council and Australian Plantations Group commenced a major expansion of Acacia mangium plantations to supply woodchips. The operations of Australian Plantations Group (later named Sylvatech) were purchased by Great Southern Group in 2005. In 2006, the operations were reported to be "the largest native-forest clearing project in northern Australia". In September 2007 the Northern Territory Government investigated claims that the company had breached environmental laws, with financial penalties being imposed by the Federal environment department in 2008. Much of the cleared land is used for cattle or monoculture plantations, which the timber company has maintained are an important source of local jobs. Great Southern Plantations collapsed in early 2009, and the Tiwi Land Council has been examining options for future management of the plantations.

The islands have mineral sands on both Melville Island's north coast and the western coast of Bathurst Island. In 2005, Matilda Minerals developed a proposal for mining on the islands, which was assessed and approved in 2006. In 2007 sand mining produced the first shipments of zircon and rutile for export to China. A  shipment was made in June 2007, with a further  shipped later that year. Matilda Minerals planned to conduct mining for four years, but in August 2008, its Tiwi operations were halted, and in October of that year it was placed in administration.

In March 2020, Plantation Management Partners (PMP), which manages around 30,000 hectares of acacia mangium trees on the Tiwis, made the decision to delay the year's harvest while demand for woodchips in China was depressed due to the COVID-19 pandemic.

See also
 Hector (storm)

References

Further reading

 
Tiwi Islands Regional Council LGA (Regional Development Australia, Northern Territory)

External links

Tiwi Land Council 
Tiwi Islands Shire Council
 

 
Islands of the Northern Territory
Tourist attractions in the Northern Territory
Important Bird Areas of the Northern Territory
IBRA subregions
Arnhem Land tropical savanna